The Florida A&M Rattlers football team represents Florida A&M University in the sport of American football. The Rattlers compete in the Football Championship Subdivision (FCS) of Division I of the National Collegiate Athletic Association (NCAA). Starting with the fall 2021 season, the Rattlers will compete in the East Division of the Southwestern Athletic Conference (SWAC), after a long tenure in the Mid-Eastern Athletic Conference (MEAC). They play their home games at Bragg Memorial Stadium in Tallahassee. The Rattlers have won 15 black college football national championship, 29 Southern Intercollegiate Athletic Conference (SIAC) titles, eight MEAC titles, and one I-AA national title in the history of their football program. During the 2004 season, the Rattlers briefly attempted to move up to Division I-A (now known as the FBS) and become the only HBCU at college football's highest level, but the team was forced to abort its bid.

History

Classifications
1952–1972: NCAA College Division
1973–1977: NCAA Division II
1978–2003: NCAA Division I–AA
2004: NCAA Division I–A
2005–present: NCAA Division I–AA/FCS

Conference memberships
1907–1925: Independent
1926–1978: Southern Intercollegiate Athletic Conference (SIAC)
1979–1983: Mid-Eastern Athletic Conference (MEAC)
1984–1985: Division I–AA Independent
1986–2003: Mid-Eastern Athletic Conference
2004: Division I–A Independent
2005–2020: Mid-Eastern Athletic Conference
 2021–present: Southwestern Athletic Conference

 In 1978, FAMU was a member of SIAC, a Division II conference. FAMU had successfully petitioned the NCAA for Division I classification (Division I-AA in football), which took effect on September 1, 1978.

Annual Classic
Florida Classic
Orange Blossom Classic

Championships

National, Black College
The Rattlers claim 16 historically black colleges and universities (HBCUs) championships:. 15 come from official HBCU championship selectors, while the 2021 claim is the result of a NCAA power ranking of FCS HBCU teams.
1938
1942
1950
1952
1953
1954
1957
1959
1961
1962
1977
1978
1998
2001

National, Division I–AA/FCS

National, Division II/College Division
One Florida A&M team has been awarded a national championship from NCAA-designated designated major selector, as they were declared Associated Press (AP) small college national champion for the 1962 season. While the school holds the distinction of being the first HBCU to win NCAA football title, the championship is not claimed by the university.

Conference championships
Florida A&M has won 37 conference championships, 30 outright and 7 shared.

† Co-champions

Division I-AA/FCS Playoffs results
The Rattlers have appeared in the I-AA/FCS playoffs eight times with a record of 5–7. They were I-AA National Champions in 1978, the first year of Division I-AA.

College Football Hall of Fame members
Jake Gaither
Willie Galimore
Billy Joe
Tyrone McGriff

Alumni in the NFL
Over 60 Florida A&M alumni have played in the NFL, including:
Ray Alexander
Gene Atkins
Greg Coleman
Al Denson
Hewritt Dixon
Glen Edwards
Chad Fann
Roger Finnie
Derrick Gainer
Willie Galimore
Hubert Ginn
Charles Goodrum
Quinn Gray
Bob Hayes
Earl Holmes
Henry Lawrence
Herm Lee
Frank Marion
Willie McClung
Terry Mickens
Riley Morris
Jamie Nails
Nate Newton
Carleton Oats
Ken Riley
Vernice Smith
Wally Williams
Robert Wilson

References

External links
 

 
American football teams established in 1907
1907 establishments in Florida